Amīr ash-Shu‘arā’ Abū Abdullāh Muḥammad b. ‘Abd al-Malik Mu‘izzī  (romanized as Mu'ezzi) (born Nishapur 1048/9) was a Persian poet. He ranks as one of the great masters of the Persian panegyric form known as qasideh.

Mu'izzī's father, Abd al-Malik Burhani, was poet laureate of Sanjar under Malik Shāh I and Sultān Sanjar. His son followed, self-consciously, in his footsteps, styling himself as his father's deputy (nāyib) and inheriting his role. He was renowned both in his own time and to later scholarship.

His surviving divan extends to 18,000 distichs. Anvari accuses Mu'izzi of copying the verses of other poets (which cannot be proven for certain), yet Anvari himself is known to have copied Mu'izzi's verses. Mu'izzi is said to have died by the arrow shot at him by the King's son in 1125 CE for reasons unknown. He was accidentally shot by Sanjar.

Work

Some of his poems were dedicated to his father's patrons. Not much is known of his father's work. Burhani died in Qazvin during the early years of Malik-Shah I's reign. Mu'izzi's claim to have succeeded his father as 'the nightingale's child', seemingly justified by a famous verse cited by Nizami Aruzi and Aufi, has been cast into doubt as lacunae and possible attribution of the line to another writer. Burhani's divan seems to have been lost early in history, and few references survive from anthologies or later works. Raduyani quotes Burhani once in Tarjuman ul-Balagha, but other than this, his name is absent from known works produced in later centuries, such as Rashid al-Din Vatvat's Hada'iq al-sihr and Shams-i Qays's al-Mujam. Both later works contain references to Mu'izzi, but none of his father. Mu'izzi himself quotes his father's work once, in a qasida for the deputy of Nizam al-Mulk.

Comparison with Farrukhi Sistani

Mu'izzi was an admirer of Unsuri and Farrukhi Sistani. His poems were composed in the panegyric tradition they established, which was later to be imitated by Sanai and others.

References

Sources

Further reading

See also

List of Persian poets and authors
Persian literature

1048 births
1125 deaths
11th-century Persian-language poets
12th-century Persian-language poets
Accidental deaths in Iran
Poets from Nishapur
Poets from the Seljuk Empire
11th-century Iranian people
12th-century Iranian people